Kanchikacherla mandal is one of the 20 mandals in NTR district of the Indian state of Andhra Pradesh. It is under the administration of Vijayawada revenue division and the headquarters are located at Kanchikacherla. The mandal is bounded Veerullapadu, Chanderlapadu and Ibrahimpatnam mandals. A portion of it lies on the banks of Krishna river, separating it from Guntur district and also Munneru river separates it from Nandigama mandal.

Towns and villages 

 census, the mandal has 16 settlements and all are villages.

The settlements in the mandal are listed below:

Note: †-Mandal headquarter

References 

Mandals in NTR district